Miss Palmer can refer to:
Stage name of Alyssa Palmer, featured artist on "No Beef"
Miss Palmer, the nurse of the Happy Dale Mental Hospital in Runaway: A Twist of Fate